Quick Gun Murugun: Misadventures of an Indian Cowboy is a 2009 Indian English-language Comedy Western film directed by Shashanka Ghosh and written by Rajesh Devraj. The film stars Rajendra Prasad as the title character alongside Rambha, Anuradha Menon and Nassar. It is a spoof on Indian western films, featuring songs, melodrama and action sequences including a duel in a traffic jam.

The character of Murugun was created in 1994 and was featured in India's Channel V promos. Around 1998, the film version was in the works. In the 2007 Hindi film Om Shanti Om, Shah Rukh Khan films a scene as Murugun, trying to trick his love interest into believing he is a star of Tamil cinema.

Eventually, the film was released in 2009. Quick Gun Murugun has been exhibited at the London Film Festival, the Indian Film Festival of Los Angeles, the New York Asian Film Festival and in The Museum of Modern Art, New York City (MoMa).

The film was dubbed in several languages, including Hindi, Tamil, and Telugu.

Plot 
Quick Gun Murugun is an unlikely superhero, a Tamil cowboy whose duty is to protect the world against arch villain restaurant owner Rice Plate Reddy, who wants to create the ultimate non-vegetarian dosa.  The film revolves around the adventures of Murugun along with his love-to-be Mango Dolly and Locket Lover. Murugun is a typical vegetarian cowboy who made himself into Quick Gun Murugan. He has to do something good for the world, so he believes that vegetarianism is the need of the hour. Murugun enters into a battle that spans time and space, from a small south Indian village to Heaven and then finally to cosmopolitan Mumbai across 25 years. He is torn between Mango Dolly, who loves him secretly, and his first love Locket Lover. His loyalty is put to the test. Mango Dolly gets hit by a bullet. While dying, she expresses her love to Murugun. Realizing that he too loves Mango Dolly, he tells her that he too loves her and that she can "stay with him". Finally, Murugun is able to succeed in his mission by defeating Rice Plate Reddy.

Cast 

 Rajendra Prasad as Quick Gun Murugun
 Rambha as Mango Dolly
 Anuradha Menon as Locket Lover
 Nassar as Rice Plate Reddy
 Raju Sundaram as Rowdy MBA
 Ashwin Mushran as Dr. Django
 Shanmugarajan as Gun Powder
 Vinay Pathak as Chitragupta
 Kishori Ballal as Mrs. S. G. Murugan
 Sandhya Mridul as TV Host
 Manjit Baba as Dacoit
 Ranvir Shorey in a guest appearance
 Gaurav Kapoor in a guest appearance
 Robin Gurung in a guest appearance as a boka cameraman

Reception 
Chandrima Pal of Rediff.com gave 3.5 out of 5, saying 'From his two-minute life span on a music channel, Quick Gun Murugan has come a long way indeed and deserves this full-length feature dedicated to our very own Indian Cowboy with a buckle to die for (Stylists, may I please have a replica of the same?!). On the whole, QGM is as delicious as Mrs Murugan's dosais. As Rice Plate would have said, "A1, Tip Top!"'. Taran Adarsh of Bollywood Hungama gave this film 3/5 rating and described it as 'Quick Gun Murugan is an innovative experience. The adventures should appeal to the youth mainly. Rajeev Masand gave it a 3 out of 5 and said 'Good spoofs are hard to come by, but director Shashanka Ghosh’s Quick Gun Murugun is a rare exception'. Mayank Shekhar of Hindustan Times said 'This one is so much funnier as a whole. Go for it, I say!' and gave 3 out of 5 stars.

Soundtrack 

*remixed by Deep & DJ Chandu

References

External links 
 

2000s Hindi-language films
2000s parody films
2000s Western (genre) comedy films
2009 action comedy films
2009 comedy films
2009 films
English-language Indian films
Films scored by Raghu Dixit
Films directed by Shashanka Ghosh
Films set in heaven
Films set in Mumbai
Fox Star Studios films
Indian action comedy films
Indian parody films
Indian Western (genre) comedy films
2000s English-language films